Alexander John Russell (born 17 March 1973) is an English former professional footballer who played as a central midfielder. His father,  
Alex Russell played professionally for Southport, Blackburn Rovers, Tranmere Rovers and Los Angeles Aztecs.

In January 2008 Russell joined League One side Cheltenham Town on a one-month loan. On 31 January, Russell's loan was extended to the end of the season. He signed permanently for Cheltenham Town on 17 June 2008 after he was released by Bristol City. Joined League Two side Exeter City on loan in February 2009 until the end of the season with a view to a permanent deal.

He signed a permanent one-year deal with Exeter City in July 2009. On 14 May 2010, it was announced that he had been released by Exeter, along with eight other players.

On 4 January 2011, it was announced that a move to League One Yeovil Town had been finalised. He was informed by the club at the end of the 2010/11 season that he was one of seven players who would be re-signed, Russell later rejected this offer and returned to Bath City. But he left when Bath was relegated at the end of the 2011–12 season from the Conference National, Russell signed with Southern League South & West Division side Clevedon Town in the summer of 2012.

On 10 March 2013, he announced on Twitter, "Officially retiring from playing! 24 yr career,not a bad effort! #greattimes".

After spells coaching at Bristol City, Tranmere Rovers, Oldham Athletic and Southport, Russell came out of retirement and played for Shepton Mallet and Bristol Manor Farm before emigrating to Australia and started coaching at Jamie Gosling's football academy in Cairns while also turning out for Stratford Dolphins at the age of 46. In 2020, he moved to another FNQ Football league side Leichhardt Lions in a dual player/assistant coach role, and won the FNQ Football Men's Premier Player of the Year award in 2021 – aged 48.

Honours
Individual
PFA Team of the Year: 2002–03 Third Division, 2003–04 Third Division

References

External links
Alex Russell profile at ctfc.com
Alex Russell profile at bcfc.co.uk
Alex Russell profile at ntfc.co.uk

1973 births
Living people
People from Crosby, Merseyside
English footballers
Association football midfielders
Burscough F.C. players
Rochdale A.F.C. players
Glenavon F.C. players
Cambridge United F.C. players
Torquay United F.C. players
Bristol City F.C. players
Cheltenham Town F.C. players
Northampton Town F.C. players
Exeter City F.C. players
Bath City F.C. players
Yeovil Town F.C. players
Clevedon Town F.C. players
Southport F.C. players
Bristol Manor Farm F.C. players
English Football League players
National League (English football) players
Southern Football League players